Darwin's Bastards: Astounding Tales from Tomorrow is a 2010 anthology of dystopian science fiction stories. It was edited by Zsuzsi Gartner, and published by Douglas & McIntyre. All of its stories were written by Canadians.

Contributors
Adam Lewis Schroeder
Annabel Lyon
Anosh Irani
Buffy Cram
David Whitton
Douglas Coupland
Elyse Friedman
Heather O'Neill
Jay Brown
Jessica Grant
Laura Trunkey
Lee Henderson
Mark Anthony Jarman
Matthew J. Trafford
Neil Smith
Oliver Kellhammer
Pasha Malla
Paul Carlucci
Sheila Heti
Stephen Marche
Timothy Taylor
William Gibson
Yann Martel

Critical reception
The Los Angeles Times stated that the stories were of varying degrees of originality, but emphasized that "the quality of writing across the collection is wonderfully high". The Globe and Mail called it "excellent", and CBC Radio ranked it as the best Canadian work of science fiction and fantasy for 2010, while the Georgia Straight described the scenarios in the collection as "dismal", "grim", and "genuinely scarifying", while specifying that the collection as a whole is "riotously enjoyable".

Quill and Quire, however, criticized Gartner's editorial decision to mostly exclude science fiction authors with genre experience in favor of  primarily literary contributors, stating that many of the collection's "futuristic and dystopian speculations hang suspended like colloids in slack, unformed narratives", and observing that the contributors seem to "have not read very widely in the genre", with the result that many of the scenarios portrayed "feel second-hand at best". Similarly, Geist concluded that "(m)any of the stories (...) try too hard", and that "(t)he quality and originality vary wildly".

References

Science fiction anthologies
Canadian anthologies
2010 anthologies
Douglas & McIntyre books